The Worcester Worcesters were a 19th-century Major League Baseball team from 1880 to 1882 in the National League.  The team is referred to, at times, as the Brown Stockings or the Ruby Legs; however, no contemporary sources from the time exist that support the use of either name. The team played their home games at the Worcester Driving Park Grounds in the Worcester Agricultural Fairgrounds, located south of Highland Street between Sever Street and Russell Street in Worcester, Massachusetts.

History
In 1879, Worcester played in the National Association, a league consisting of teams the Northeast. The National League was interested in Worcester as a potential replacement for the failed Syracuse Stars franchise primarily based on the performance of their ace pitcher, Lee Richmond, who pitched several exhibition games against  National League opponents and went 6–2. He also pitched and won one game for the Boston Red Stockings. To admit Worcester to the National League, the league's board of directors waived the requirement that league cities have a population of at least 75,000 (Worcester's population was 58,000). To raise the capital to support their entry into the major leagues, the team sold shares for $35 (with the price including a season ticket), sponsored a walking race that attracted 3,000 people, arranged for discount packages of train fare and baseball tickets for fans from outside the city, and held benefit concerts and dramatic performances.

In December 1879, Worcester became the first professional baseball team to visit Cuba. The trip was a financial failure, as they were only able to play two games against Cuban teams.

On June 12, 1880, pitcher Lee Richmond threw the first perfect game in Major League history, against the Cleveland Blues.  The team made history again on August 20 of the same year by becoming the first team to be no-hit at home, when Pud Galvin of the Buffalo Bisons defeated them 1–0.

According to Lee Allen, Cincinnati writer and eventual director of the Baseball Hall of Fame, the Worcester club impacted the National League in another way in 1880; it was instrumental in having the Cincinnati Reds expelled from the league after the season, due to violations of the league rules against selling beer at the ballpark. In his 1948 book, The Cincinnati Reds (published by Putnam), Allen took some satisfaction in pointing out that the Reds re-formed in 1882, initially as a member of the American Association, the same year that Worcester's days as a major league franchise, as well as their influence, came to an end.

The Worcester team was dropped from the league shortly before the end of the 1882 season, as Worcester was seen as too small to support major league sport; the team was encouraged to finish out its schedule as a lame duck team. Their last two games of the season against the Troy Trojans (also expelled from the NL for the same reasons) drew only 6 and 25 fans respectively; the attendance of six is a record low attendance for all league games open to spectators.

Needing an eighth team to balance the schedule, the National League granted an expansion franchise to Philadelphia which became the Philadelphia Phillies (who were also alternatively known as the Quakers until 1890).  Many sources suggest that the Worcester club was moved to Philadelphia; however, only the Worcester's former NL spot was moved.  All available evidence suggests there is no direct link between the two teams (most significantly, no players from the 1882 Worcester club ended up with the 1883 Phillies).

Notable alumni

Lip Pike, four-time Major League Baseball home run champion
Lee Richmond, first player to throw a perfect game

Baseball Hall of Famers

See also
1880 Worcester Worcesters season
1881 Worcester Worcesters season
1882 Worcester Worcesters season
Worcester Worcesters all-time roster

References

External links
Baseball-Reference.com page

1879 establishments in Massachusetts
1882 disestablishments in Massachusetts
Baseball teams established in 1879
Baseball teams disestablished in 1882
Worcesters
Defunct baseball teams in Massachusetts
Defunct Major League Baseball teams
Professional baseball teams in Massachusetts